KVAD may refer to:

 Moody Air Force Base (ICAO code KVAD)
 KVAD-LD, a low-power television station (channel 16) licensed to serve Amarillo, Texas, United States